Kira Kira may refer to:

 Kirakira, the provincial capital of the Makira-Ulawa Province in Solomon Islands
 Kira-Kira, a young adult novel by Cynthia Kadohata
 Kirakira (visual novel), by Overdrive, 2007
 "Kira Kira/Akari", a 2015 single by Every Little Thing
 "Kira Kira" (Ai song), a 2017 single by Ai
 "Kira Kira" (Beni song), 2009

See also